Collision Course... Paradox II is the ninth studio album released by the band Royal Hunt and the first to feature American singer Mark Boals.

Track listing
All songs written by André Andersen.
 "Principles of Paradox" - 5:42
 "The First Rock" - 4:47
 "Exit Wound" - 6:29
 "Divide and Reign" - 5:25
 "High Noon at the Battlefield" - 3:57
 "The Clan" - 4:39
 "Blood In Blood Out" - 6:04
 "Tears of the Sun" - 6:00
 "Hostile Breed" - 5:07
 "Chaos A.C." - 3:25

Personnel
André Andersen – keyboards and guitar
Mark Boals – vocals
Marcus Jidell – guitars, cello
Allan Sørensen  – drums
Per Schelander – bass

Guests:
Kenny Lubcke – backing vocals
Maria McTurk – backing vocals
Ian Perry - backing vocals
Doogie White - backing vocals
Henrik Brockmann - backing vocals
Soma Allpass - backing vocals, cello
Michelle Raitzin - backing vocals
Patricia Skovgaard - violin
Erik Rosenqvist - woodwinds, accordion

Charts

References

Royal Hunt albums
2008 albums
Frontiers Records albums
Concept albums
Sequel albums